Knattspyrnufélag Garðabæjar, abbreviated as KFG, is an Icelandic football club based in Garðabær. It was founded in 2008. The club plays in 3. deild karla.

Current squad

Kit evolution

Honours

Fjórðadeildinn (level 5)
Promoted: 2016
Þriðjadeildinn (level 4)
Promoted: 2018

Top scorers by season

Notable former players

(currently focusing on his promising darts career)

References

Football clubs in Iceland